Atanu Bhattacharya  is an Indian former footballer, Asian All Star Goalkeeper and captain of the India national team. He has played for India in the 1984 Asian Cup. During his playing career, he has represented all the three giants - Kingfisher East Bengal, Mohun Bagan and Mohammedan Sporting Club (Kolkata) for 5 years each. He has played for the India national team for over 12 years. He has also captained the national team to various triumphs. He is remembered for his immense contribution to the India national team and also for his selection into the Asian All Star team. He is one of those footballers who has played for all the three clubs. A fun fact being that he first played for India and then got a call for the Bengal team that later won the Santosh Trophy. He was only at BNR when he got selected for the India national team unlike most who were playing at big clubs. His performance in the game against Argentina in the year 1984 is highly recognised.

Playing career
His contributions don't end just at the national team. He was selected as the Goalkeeper coach for over 5 years at Mohun Bagan, in the late 1990s and early 2000's. Post which he was also selected as the GK coach of the Indian team alongside Syed Nayeemuddin. He even played a pivotal role in helping India win their SAFF Championship under the leadership of then captain Bhaichung Bhutia. From the year 2009 to 2013 he was again selected as the Goal Keeper coach of East Bengal where he helped the club win 9 trophies in just 4 seasons. 

Alongside his accolades as a player, he is also regarded as one of the finest goal keeper coaches this country has ever seen.

Honours
Individual
AFC Asian All Stars: 1985

See also
 List of India national football team captains

References

External links
Stats at RSSSF

Living people
Indian footballers
Indian football coaches
India international footballers
1984 AFC Asian Cup players
Association football goalkeepers
Mohammedan SC (Kolkata) players
East Bengal Club players
Mohun Bagan AC players
Calcutta Football League players
Footballers from West Bengal
Footballers at the 1986 Asian Games
Year of birth missing (living people)
Asian Games competitors for India